A sum-of-squares optimization program is an optimization problem with a linear cost function and a particular type of constraint on the decision variables. These constraints are of the form that when the decision variables are used as coefficients in certain polynomials, those polynomials should have the polynomial SOS property. When fixing the maximum degree of the polynomials involved, sum-of-squares optimization is also known as the Lasserre hierarchy of relaxations in semidefinite programming.

Sum-of-squares optimization techniques have been applied across a variety of areas, including control theory (in particular, for searching for polynomial Lyapunov functions for dynamical systems described by polynomial vector fields), statistics, finance and machine learning.<ref>Tan, W., Packard, A., 2004. "Searching for control Lyapunov functions using sums of squares programming". In: Allerton Conf. on Comm., Control and Computing. pp. 210–219.</ref>A. Chakraborty, P. Seiler, and G. Balas, "Susceptibility of F/A-18 Flight Controllers to the Falling-Leaf Mode: Nonlinear Analysis," AIAA Journal of Guidance, Control, and Dynamics, vol. 34 no. 1 (2011), pp. 73–85.

Optimization problem

The problem can be expressed as

subject to

Here "SOS" represents the class of sum-of-squares (SOS) polynomials.
The vector  and polynomials  are given as part of the data for the optimization problem. The quantities  are the decision variables. SOS programs can be converted to semidefinite programs (SDPs) using the duality of the SOS polynomial program and a relaxation for constrained polynomial optimization using positive-semidefinite matrices, see the following section.

 Dual problem: constrained polynomial optimization 
Suppose we have an -variate polynomial  , and suppose that we would like to minimize this polynomial over a subset . Suppose furthermore that the constraints on the subset  can be encoded using  polynomial equalities of degree at most , each of the form  where  is a polynomial of degree at most . A natural, though generally non-convex program for this optimization problem is the following:

subject to:

This program is generally non-convex, because the constraints are not convex. One possible convex relaxation for this minimization problem uses semidefinite programming to replace the rank-one matrix of variables  with a positive-semidefinite matrix : we index each monomial of size at most  by a multiset  of at most  indices, . We then write the following semidefinite program in the variables :

subject to:

The third constraint ensures that the value of a monomial that appears several times within the matrix is equal throughout the matrix, and is added to make  respect the symmetries present in the quadratic form .

 Duality 
One can take the dual of the above semidefinite program and obtain the following program:

subject to:

We have a variable  corresponding to the constraint  (where  is the matrix with all entries zero save for the entry indexed by ), a real variable for each polynomial constraint  and for each group of multisets , we have a dual variable for the symmetry constraint . The positive-semidefiniteness constraint ensures that  is a sum-of-squares of polynomials over : by a characterization of positive-semidefinite matrices, for any positive-semidefinite matrix , we can write  for vectors . Thus for any ,

where we have identified the vectors  with the coefficients of a polynomial of degree at most .

The above can also be extended to regions  defined by polynomial inequalities.

 Sum-of-squares hierarchy 
The sum-of-squares hierarchy (SOS hierarchy), also known as the Lasserre hierarchy, is a hierarchy of convex relaxations of increasing power and increasing computational cost. For each natural number  the corresponding convex relaxation is known as the th level or -th round of the SOS hierarchy. The st round, when , corresponds to a basic semidefinite program, or to sum-of-squares optimization over polynomials of degree at most . To augment the basic convex program at the st level of the hierarchy to -th level, additional variables and constraints are added to the program to have the program consider polynomials of degree at most .

The SOS hierarchy derives its name from the fact that the value of the objective function at the -th level is bounded with a sum-of-squares proof using polynomials of degree at most  via the dual (see "Duality" above). Consequently, any sum-of-squares proof that uses polynomials of degree at most  can be used to bound the objective value, allowing one to prove guarantees on the tightness of the relaxation.

In conjunction with a theorem of Berg, this further implies that given sufficiently many rounds, the relaxation becomes arbitrarily tight on any fixed interval. Berg's result states that every non-negative real polynomial within a bounded interval can be approximated within accuracy  on that interval with a sum-of-squares of real polynomials of sufficiently high degree, and thus if  is the polynomial objective value as a function of the point , if the inequality  holds for all  in the region of interest, then there must be a sum-of-squares proof of this fact. Choosing  to be the minimum of the objective function over the feasible region, we have the result.

 Computational cost 
When optimizing over a function in  variables, the -th level of the hierarchy can be written as a semidefinite program over  variables, and can be solved in time  using the ellipsoid method.

Sum-of-squares background

A polynomial  is a sum of squares (SOS) if there exist polynomials  such that . For example,

is a sum of squares since

where 

Note that if  is a sum of squares then  for all . Detailed descriptions of polynomial SOS are available.Parrilo, P. (2003) "Semidefinite programming relaxations for semialgebraic problems". Mathematical Programming Ser. B 96 (2), 293–320.

Quadratic forms can be expressed as  where  is a symmetric matrix. Similarly, polynomials of degree ≤ 2d'' can be expressed as 

where the vector  contains all monomials of degree . This is known as the Gram matrix form. An important fact is that  is SOS if and only if there exists a symmetric and positive-semidefinite matrix  such that .
This provides a connection between SOS polynomials and positive-semidefinite matrices.

Software tools 
 SOSTOOLS, licensed under the GNU GPL. The reference guide is available at arXiv:1310.4716 [math.OC], and a presentation about its internals is available here.
 CDCS-sos, a package from CDCS, an augmented Lagrangian method solver, to deal with large scale SOS programs.
 The SumOfSquares extension of JuMP for Julia.
 TSSOS for Julia, a polynomial optimization tool based on the sparsity adapted moment-SOS hierarchies.
 For the dual problem of constrained polynomial optimization, GloptiPoly for MATLAB/Octave, Ncpol2sdpa for Python and MomentOpt for Julia.

References 

Mathematical optimization
Real algebraic geometry